Monster Tower is a  tall sandstone tower located in the Island in the Sky District of Canyonlands National Park, in San Juan County, Utah, United States.

Description
The tower is situated 300 feet southeast of Washer Woman, which is a towering arch nearly as high. Washer Woman is so named because the feature gives the appearance of a woman bent over a washtub. Monster and Washer Woman are an eroded fin composed of Wingate Sandstone, which is the remains of wind-borne sand dunes deposited approximately 200 million years ago in the Late Triassic. A short hike to Mesa Arch provides the easiest view of Monster Tower. Access to the tower is via the four-wheel drive White Rim Road, which is the other way to see Monster. The top of this geological formation rises 1,400 feet above the road in approximately one mile. Precipitation runoff from Monster Tower drains southeast into the nearby Colorado River via Buck Canyon.

Climbing
The first ascent of Monster Tower was made in December 1963 by Layton Kor, Larry Dalke, and Cub Schaefer via the South Ridge. The best route on Monster is the  North Ridge, which was first climbed in 1981 by Ken Trout and Kirk Miller. Another alpine route, Monster of Rock (5.11) on the south face, was first climbed in 1982 by Edward Webster and Chester Dreiman. Los Banditos is an aid climb.

Climate
Spring and fall are the most favorable seasons to visit Monster Tower. According to the Köppen climate classification system, it is located in a Cold semi-arid climate zone, which is defined by the coldest month having an average mean temperature below −0 °C (32 °F) and at least 50% of the total annual precipitation being received during the spring and summer.

Gallery

See also
 Colorado Plateau
 Geology of the Canyonlands area

References

External links

 Canyonlands National Park National Park Service
 Monster Tower weather forecast: National Weather Service

Landforms of San Juan County, Utah
Colorado Plateau
Canyonlands National Park
Sandstone formations of the United States